Mathias Klenske (born 25 October 1983) is a Danish voice actor who is best known for his role as Adam in the film Frække Frida og de frygtløse spioner – an adaption based on a series of books by Lykke Nielsen. Klenske regularly dubs characters that appear in cartoons, anime and video games. He is also well known to children in Denmark as the Danish voice of Ash Ketchum from the Pokémon anime. He is a member of the theater Hamlet Revyen.

Klenske works at Dubberman Denmark, SDI Media Denmark, and other Danish dubbing studios, where he carries out voice work.

Biography 
Mathias Klenske was born on 25 October 1983 in northern Copenhagen. He started voice acting when he was nine years old, voicing characters in the animated series Animaniacs. He played Adam in Frække Frida og de frygtløse spioner. Three years later, Klenske made a comeback to play Børnebisp in the film Alletiders Julemand.

Roles

Live-action 
 Adam in Frække Frida og de frygtløse spioner
 Børnebisp in Alletiders Julemand

Dubbing roles

Anime and animation 
 Chazz Princeton in Yu-Gi-Oh! GX
 Ash Ketchum, Paul (DP002), and Lance in Pokémon
 Ash Ketchum in Pokémon: The First Movie
 Ash Ketchum in Pokémon: The Movie 2000
 Ash Ketchum in Pokémon 3: The Movie
 Ash Ketchum in Pokémon 4Ever
 Ash Ketchum in Pokémon Heroes
 Ash Ketchum in Pokémon: Jirachi Wish Maker
 Ash Ketchum in Pokémon: Destiny Deoxys
 Ash Ketchum in Pokémon: Lucario and the Mystery of Mew
 Ash Ketchum in Pokémon Ranger and the Temple of the Sea
 Ash Ketchum im Pokémon: The Rise of Darkrai
 Ash Ketchum in Pokémon: Giratina and the Sky Warrior
 Ash Ketchum in Pokémon: Arceus and the Jewel of Life
 Ash Ketchum in Pokémon: Zoroark: Master of Illusions
 Ash Ketchum in Pokémon the Movie: Black—Victini and Reshiram and White—Victini and Zekrom
 Ash Ketchum in Pokémon the Movie: Kyurem vs. the Sword of Justice
 Ash Ketchum in Pokémon the Movie: Genesect and the Legend Awakened
 Ash Ketchum in Pokémon the Movie: Diancie and the Cocoon of Destruction
 Chris McClean in Total Drama Island
 Chris McClean in Total Drama Action
 Chris McClean in Total Drama World Tour
 Rolf and Jonny in Ed, Edd n Eddy
 Jack Spicer in Xiaolin Showdown
 Terry McGinns in Batman Beyond
 Ron Stoppable in Kim Possible
 Fillmore in Fillmore!
 Benny in Lloyd in Space
 Robin in Teen Titans
 Johnny Test in Johnny Test
 Gorby in Finley The Fire Engine
 Kick Buttowski in Kick Buttowski: Suburban Daredevil
 Aerrow in Storm Hawks
 Rock Lee in Naruto
 Chavo in El Chavo Animado
 Chicken Little Cluck in Chicken Little (2005 film)
 Kenta Yumiya in Beyblade: Metal Fusion
 Vince LaSalle in Recess
 Numbuh One in Codename: Kids Next Door
Steve in Blue's Clues
The Nazz in Kitty Is Not a Cat

Live-action 
 Additional voice in Alvin and the Chipmunks
 Additional voice in Babe
 Herbert in 101 Dalmatians
 Juni Cortez in Spy Kids 4: All the Time in the World 
 Lou in Cats & Dogs 
 Walter Flipstick in Buzz and Tell

Video games 
 Spyro in The Legend of Spyro: Dawn of the Dragon

References

External links 
 
 

1983 births
Living people
Danish male film actors
Danish male video game actors
Danish male voice actors
Male actors from Copenhagen